Farhad Daneshjoo (born 4 March 1955 in Damghan) is an Iranian academic, and acting president of Tarbiat Modares University. He is the former president of the Azad University, which was elected for this position on 17 January 2012 and removed from his office by the university's central committee on 18 September 2013. He is said to  have been a student of PhD in England at the time of Ayatollah Khomeini's Fatwa on Salman Rushdie's death sentence. He was expelled from England  as one of the students burning a bookshop selling Rushdie's books. He was president of the Tarbiat Modares University for five years from 2005 to 2010. He is one of the three brothers of Daneshjoo. His elder brother, Kamran Daneshjoo was the Minister of Science in the government of Mahmoud Ahmadinejad and Khosro Daneshjoo was a member of City Council of Tehran. His sister, Parisa Daneshjoo is also an academic.

Education
BSc: Civil Engineering, Queen Mary College, London, UK, 1985MSc: Information System Engineering, South Bank University, London, UK, 1986PhD: Simulation of Earthquakes, University of Westminster, UK, 1991

See also
Higher education in Iran
Islamic Azad University

References

Academic staff of Tarbiat Modares University
Living people
1955 births
Academic staff of the Islamic Azad University